The Goddess of Sagebrush Gulch is a 1912 American short silent Western film directed by D. W. Griffith and starring Blanche Sweet.

Cast

See also
 D. W. Griffith filmography
 Blanche Sweet filmography

References

External links

 

1912 films
1912 Western (genre) films
1912 short films
American black-and-white films
American silent short films
Films directed by D. W. Griffith
Films with screenplays by Stanner E.V. Taylor
Silent American Western (genre) films
1910s American films